99 Cent II Diptychon is a two-part colour photograph made by Andreas Gursky in 2001. It was based on an original photograph called 99 Cent, from 1999, sometimes called "99 cent.1999".

The work depicts an interior of a supermarket with numerous aisles depicting goods. The work is digitally altered to reduce perspective. The photograph is a chromogenic color print or c-print. It is a diptych. There were 6 sets made and mounted on acrylic glass.

Record sale prices
The work became famous as being the most expensive photograph in the world when it was auctioned at Sotheby's on February 7, 2007, for a price of US$3.34 million. Another auction in New York in May 2006 fetched $2.25 million for a second print, and a third print sold for $2.48 million in November 2006 at a New York gallery. These would be the fourth and sixth-most costly photographs sold, as of 2011. On May 12, 2011, Cindy Sherman's Untitled #96 from 1981 was sold for $3.89 million.

See also
 List of most expensive photographs
 List of photographs considered the most important

References
	
Beyst, Stefan. "Essays on contemporary artists - Andreas Gursky". Retrieved on July 22, 2008

External links
Exhibitions - 2001 - Andreas Gursky on MoMA.org

Color photographs
2001 works
2001 in art
1999 works
1999 in art
1990s photographs
2000s photographs
Photographs by Andreas Gursky